Toyota Cup may refer to:
 Toyota Cup (Philadelphia Flyers), an award given annually by the Philadelphia Flyers
 Intercontinental Cup (football), an official UEFA and CONMEBOL club competition known as European/South American Cup from 1960 to 1979 and since 1980 as the Toyota Cup.
 National Youth Competition (rugby league), formerly known as the Toyota Cup, an Australian rugby league competition
 Toyota Premier Cup, a defunct football cup competition hold in Thailand